Paul Dorpat (born 1938) is a  historian, author, and photographer, specializing in the history of Seattle and Washington state. He had a weekly column in the Seattle Times and is the principal historian of HistoryLink.org, a site devoted to Washington state history.

Dorpat was a key figure of Seattle's first underground newspaper, the Helix (newspaper), which was published from March 23, 1967 until June 11, 1970. Dorpat's Times column "Now & Then" ran weekly from January 17, 1982, to December 20, 2019, totaling about 1,800 articles. Each week the column paired a historical photo of Seattle with a present-day photo from an identical or similar point of view. He has also written numerous books about Seattle.

Notes

External links

 DorpatSherrardLomont, a blog consisting of expanded versions of Dorpat's "Now and Then" Seattle Times columns.

20th-century American historians
American male non-fiction writers
21st-century American historians
Writers from Seattle
1938 births
Living people
Historians from Washington (state)
20th-century American male writers